"Princes of the Universe" is a song written by Freddie Mercury and performed by the British rock band Queen, originally released as a single in the United States on March 12, 1986 via Capitol Records. The song was written for the film Highlander, and released on the album A Kind of Magic, which also featured other selections from the Highlander song score on June 2, 1986. In 1999 it was included in Queen’s compilation album Greatest Hits III.

In terms of musical style, the song is notable for being one of the most hard-edged tracks performed by the band, featuring a bombastic sound reminiscent of contemporary hard rock and heavy metal and vocals by Mercury akin to opera. A music video for the song, which featured Mercury briefly re-enacting the film's sword-fighting scene with the titular character, achieved some notoriety.

Background
"Princes of the Universe", written and composed for Highlander, is the only song on the album for which Mercury receives sole credit. The song's name comes from the original working title of the film. It is played over the film's opening credits, and was later used as the opening theme for Highlander: The Series. The song was never released as a single in the United Kingdom, and while it never truly charted, it is considered a cult favourite because of its relation to the film. In the movie, the guitar solo is not present as it was not yet created.

Music video
The music video was directed by Russell Mulcahy, and was shot on 14 February 1986 at Elstree Studios, near London, on the Silvercup rooftop stage used for the film. It consists mostly of Queen performing the song, intercut with scenes from Highlander. Christopher Lambert reprises his role as Connor MacLeod for a brief appearance in the video, where he swordfights Freddie Mercury, who uses his microphone stand as a sword. Brian May is seen playing a Washburn RR11V instead of his Red Special. The video was regularly played on MTV. It was released on Greatest Flix III (VHS, 1999) and Greatest Video Hits 2 (DVD, 2003).

Charts

Personnel
Freddie Mercury – lead and backing vocals, synthesizer
Brian May – lead and rhythm guitars, backing vocals
Roger Taylor – drums, backing vocals
John Deacon – bass guitar

See also

1986 in music
Queen discography

References

External links

Queen (band) songs
1986 singles
1986 songs
Film theme songs
Songs about princes
Songs from Highlander (franchise)
Songs written by Freddie Mercury
Song recordings produced by Reinhold Mack
Music videos directed by Russell Mulcahy
EMI Records singles
Capitol Records singles
Hollywood Records singles
British hard rock songs
British heavy metal songs